Thomas Hedin (born July 5, 1957), is a retired ice hockey player who spent 8 seasons with Skellefteå AIK and two seasons with IF Björklöven. Hedin led Skellefteå AIK in scoring in four of his seasons with them.

References

1957 births
Living people
Swedish ice hockey forwards
IF Björklöven players
Skellefteå AIK players